Metasia ibericalis is a species of moth in the family Crambidae. It is found in France, Spain and Portugal, as well as North Africa (including Morocco and Algeria).

The wingspan is about 19–22 mm.

References

Moths described in 1894
Metasia
Moths of Europe